Estonian Cyclists' Union (abbreviation EJL) is the national governing body of cycle racing in Estonia.

The EJL is a member of the UCI and the UEC.

References

External links
 

National members of the European Cycling Union
Cycle racing organizations
Cycling
Cycle racing in Estonia